Pop Life may refer to:
"Pop Life" (Prince song), 1985
Pop Life (Bananarama album), 1991
Pop Life (David Guetta album)
Pop Life (Breathe album), 1998
Pop Life (TV series), a British documentary series about pop music
Pop Life (7th Heaven album)
Pop Life TV, a Filipino TV channel